Rodongja Sinmun (Workers' Newspaper) is the organ of the Central Committee of the General Federation of Trade Unions of Korea, the government-controlled federation of trade unions of North Korea.
The organ based in Pyongyang and its editor-in-chief is Ri Song-ju.

The paper was founded in February 1948.

See also
 List of newspapers in North Korea
 Telecommunications in North Korea
 Media of North Korea

References

Newspapers published in North Korea
Mass media in North Korea